Pierre Joly (born 11 February 1946) is a French former professional tennis player.

Active in the 1960s and 1970s, Joly was ranked as high as seven in France.

Joly had a career win over Guillermo Vilas (Beckenham in 1972) and was a mixed doubles quarter-finalist at the 1974 French Open, with his wife Anna-Maria Nasuelli.

References

External links
 
 

1946 births
Living people
French male tennis players